State Route 144 (SR 144) is an  state highway that travels in a west-to-east direction through portions of Appling, Tattnall, Long, Liberty, Bryan counties in the east-central of the U.S. state of Georgia. It connects Baxley with southeastern Bryan County.

Route description
SR 144 begins at an intersection with US 341/SR 27 just east of Baxley, within Appling County. It heads north on Industrial Park Dr approximately 1.5 miles to an intersection with Lanes Bridge Rd, where SR 144 turns east and resumes its old alignment, through rural areas of the county, until it meets an intersection with SR 121/SR 169. The three routes run concurrent to the northeast, across the Altamaha River into Tattnall County. Just before the concurrency ends is an intersection with SR 178 (Dewey D. Rush Highway). The highway heads northeast into Glennville. It meets SR 23/SR 57 (West Barnard Street). The three routes head concurrent into the main part of town, where they intersect with US 25/US 301/SR 73 (Veterans Boulevard). At this intersection, SR 73 ends, and SR 23/SR 57 split from SR 144 and form a concurrency with US 25/US 301 to the south. After leaving Glennville, the highway crosses into Long County and the boundaries of Fort Stewart. In the fort, it crosses into Liberty County, and has a very brief concurrency with SR 119. It heads northeast through the fort and enters Bryan County. A little ways after the county line, the route curves to the southeast. Immediately after leaving the fort, in Richmond Hill, is an interchange with Interstate 95 (I-95). Farther in town, SR 144 has an intersection with US 17/SR 25. After leaving town, it continues to the southeast and curves to the south to meet SR 144 Spur (Fort McAllister Road), which leads to Fort McAllister Historic Park. The road continues in a southerly direction, through Keller, and on to meet its eastern terminus, on Bryan Neck Road, just north of the intersection of Fancy Hall Drive & Brown Road in the southeastern part of the county.

The only section of SR 144 that is part of the National Highway System, a system of roadways important to the nation's economy, defense, and mobility, is the section between SR 119 and I-95.

Major intersections

Related route

State Route 144 Spur (SR 144 Spur) is a  spur route that exists entirely within the southern part of Bryan County.

It begins southeast of Richmond Hill, at an intersection with the SR 144 mainline. The highway heads east, south of the Ogeechee River until it meets its eastern terminus, the entrance to Fort McAllister Historic Park.

SR 144 Spur is not part of the National Highway System, a system of roadways important to the nation's economy, defense, and mobility.

See also

References

External links

 Georgia Roads (Routes 141 - 160)

144
Transportation in Appling County, Georgia
Transportation in Tattnall County, Georgia
Transportation in Long County, Georgia
Transportation in Liberty County, Georgia
Transportation in Bryan County, Georgia